Leptostylopsis cristatus is a species of longhorn beetles of the subfamily Lamiinae. It was described by Fisher in 1925.

References

Acanthocinini
Beetles described in 1925